W.A.K.O. European Championships 1981 were the fifth European kickboxing championships hosted by the W.A.K.O. organization organized by one of the pioneers of Irish kickboxing George Canning.  The championships were open to amateur men based in Europe only although each country was allowed more than one competitor per weight division, with the styles on offer being Full-Contact and Semi-Contact kickboxing.  By the end of the competition regular leaders West Germany were the top nation with the largest number of medals, with Great Britain in second and Italy third.  The event was held in 1981 in Dublin, Ireland.

Men's Full-Contact Kickboxing

Absent from the 1981 world championships in Milan, Full-Contact returned to the W.A.K.O. European championships in Dublin.  There were the usual seven weight divisions, ranging from 57 kg/125.4 lbs to over 84 kg/+184.8 lbs, with all bouts fought under Full-Contact rules.  More detail on Full-Contact's rules-set can be found at the W.A.K.O. website, although be aware that the rules have changed since 1981.  Notable winners included future K-1 world champion Branko Cikatić winning his third European gold medal in a row, and Ferdinand Mack continued his domination of the -69 kg division, winning his third gold medal at a W.A.K.O. championships (world and European).  By the end of the championships Great Britain was the top nation in Full-Contact just about beating West Germany into second with two golds, two silvers and three bronze medals.

Men's Full-Contact Kickboxing Medals Table

Men's Semi-Contact Kickboxing

The Semi-Contact category differed from Full-Contact in that fights were won on points given to superior skill, speed and technique and physical force was limited - more information on Semi-Contact can be found on the W.A.K.O. website, although the rules will have changed since 1981.  As with previous events there was seven weight divisions, ranging from 57 kg/125.4 lbs to over 84 kg/+184.8 lbs.  The top nation in Semi-Contact was West Germany with a total of five gold medals.

Men's Semi-Contact Kickboxing Medals Table

Overall Medals Standing (Top 5)

See also
List of WAKO Amateur European Championships
List of WAKO Amateur World Championships

References

External links
 WAKO World Association of Kickboxing Organizations Official Site

WAKO Amateur European Championships events
Kickboxing in Ireland
1981 in kickboxing
International sports competitions in Dublin (city)
1981 in Ireland
1980s in Dublin (city)